Pottawatomie Lighthouse, also known as the Rock Island Light, is a lighthouse in Rock Island State Park, on Rock Island in Door County, Wisconsin. Lit in 1836, it is the oldest light station in Wisconsin and on Lake Michigan. It was served by civilian light keepers from 1836 to the 1940s, at which point it was taken over by the US Coast Guard.

History
The first lighthouse on the spot was a 1.5 story house and 30' detached tower built in 1836. Due to poor construction, it was replaced by the existing lighthouse in 1858. The original tower and dwelling were demolished in subsequent years. The current building was first lit in 1858 and continued as an active aid to navigation until 1988, when it was replaced with a modern skeletal tower and automated system.

It is the oldest light station in Door County, which has the most lighthouses of any Wisconsin county.

The lighthouse was restored by the Friends of Rock Island Lighthouse.  It is open for tours during the summer as the Pottawatomie Lighthouse Museum.  The lighthouse has been restored to a state illustrating its appearance circa 1909-1913. The restoration was performed with the help from the non-profit Friends Of Rock Island State Park. It now serves as a museum that is open for tours daily from Memorial Day to Columbus Day 10am to 4pm.  

The lighthouse was listed as Pottawatomie Lighthouse in the National Register of Historic Places in 1979, as reference #79000074. The fresnel lens, lost after the lighthouse was shut down in the late 1980s, was replaced by a plexiglass copy in 1999.

The original (1836) privy still stands on the grounds and is the oldest structure in Door County.

Gallery

References

Further reading

 Havighurst, Walter (1943) The Long Ships Passing: The Story of the Great Lakes, Macmillan Publishers.
 Oleszewski, Wes, Great Lakes Lighthouses, American and Canadian: A Comprehensive Directory/Guide to Great Lakes Lighthouses, (Gwinn, Michigan: Avery Color Studios, Inc., 1998) .
Olson, William H.  Pottawatomie Lantern Room Restored (October, 2009) Lighthouse Digest, (Archived June 14, 2011)
  (Archived June 22, 2020)
 
Pottawatomie Light History, Friends of Rock Island State Park.
 Sapulski, Wayne S., (2001) Lighthouses of Lake Michigan: Past and Present (Paperback) (Fowlerville: Wilderness Adventure Books) ; .
 Sweet, Tim. "Lighting the outer limits". Wisconsin Natural Resources, February 2000, (Archived August 22, 2010)
Wobser, David, Pottawatomie (Rock Island) Light, at Boatnerd.
 Wright, Larry and Wright, Patricia, Great Lakes Lighthouses Encyclopedia Hardback (Erin: Boston Mills Press, 2006) .

External links

Friends of Rock Island State Park - official site
Door County lighthouses at Door County Maritime Museum (Archived July 29, 2012)
NPS Inventory of Historic Light Stations (Archived August 25, 2012)
Lighthouse friends
Lighthouse Docent Documentary produced by Wisconsin Public Television

Lighthouses completed in 1836
Lighthouses completed in 1858
Lighthouses in Door County, Wisconsin
Lighthouse museums in Wisconsin
Lighthouses on the National Register of Historic Places in Wisconsin
Museums in Door County, Wisconsin
National Register of Historic Places in Door County, Wisconsin